The Presbyterian Manse near Anchorage, Kentucky is a historic Presbyterian church residence, associated with the Anchorage Presbyterian Church.  It was added to the National Register of Historic Places in 1983.

It is a one-and-a-half-story frame house built in 1910, with Moorish arches featured in the porch on its southwest and southeast sides.

References

Presbyterianism in Kentucky
Houses on the National Register of Historic Places in Kentucky
Houses completed in 1910
National Register of Historic Places in Jefferson County, Kentucky
Properties of religious function on the National Register of Historic Places in Kentucky
1910 establishments in Kentucky
Clergy houses in the United States
Anchorage, Kentucky